Campos de Sport de El Sardinero ("El Sardinero Sport Fields"), or simply El Sardinero, is a multi-purpose stadium in Santander, Spain. It is currently used mostly for football matches, serving as the home ground of the former La Liga side Racing de Santander since its inauguration in 1988, after replacing the old Estadio El Sardinero. With a capacity of 22,222 seats, it is the 28th-largest stadium in Spain and the largest in Cantabria. On September 11, 2023 it will host the  Spain national football team in a match against Cyprus.

References

External links 
Estadios de Espana 

Racing de Santander
Multi-purpose stadiums in Spain
Football venues in Cantabria
Sports venues completed in 1988
Rugby union stadiums in Spain